Blue Reflection: Second Light ( is a 2021 is a role-playing video game developed by Gust and a sequel to the 2017 game, Blue Reflection, as well as being a sequel to the anime Blue Reflection Ray. It was published by Koei Tecmo first in October 2021 in Japan for the PlayStation 4 and Nintendo Switch, and worldwide in November for the console market as well as Microsoft Windows via Steam. A special deluxe edition, Blue Reflection: Second Light Limited Edition was also released on the NIS America store.  In this title, the player controls a young teenage girl named, Ao Hoshizaki, whom has awakened in a mysterious school, surrounded by water with no other places in sight. Along with three other teens, Kokoro Utsubo, Yuki Kinjou and Rena Miyauchi, Ao has no memory of how she got there and no understanding of why she's there. Ao and the rest of the girls begin their quest to uncover the mystery of who they are and why they are together in this place. As Ao, the player can craft items for use in combat and structures around the school to aid in game play, as well as talk and interact with the cast of characters, including walking around the school and explore environments known as "heartscapes" to learn about the characters inner thoughts and emotions of their past lives.

Gameplay
Blue Reflection is a role-playing game, where the player in control of Ao can walk about the school and interact with the other cast members, some of whom appear throughout the course of the story. Scenes occur during school, some of which involve questions from the other girls in the group, which affect their relationship to the player character depending on the player's answers. In a series of dates and bonding episodes, the player is rewarded with additional support benefits during battles. As Ao, the player can venture into other areas known in the game as heartscapes, where they can fight monsters and collect materials for crafting. Similar to the first title, the player can also interact with characters by messaging them through an in-game mobile app for listening to crafting requests and to ask on a date. Combat game is initiated when a player hits an enemy from behind or an enemy hits the player head on. Operating on a turn based system, the player depends on a set of "ether" which builds up over time in combat. During battle, the player can chose based on their ether points what kind of attack they want, be it a quick one or a strong attack as well as focusing on enemy weaknesses or resistances.

Synopsis
Ao Hoshizaki, a girl who regards herself as "normal," was on her way to summer classes when she suddenly vanished and awoke at an isolated high school surrounded by water, with no other people and no memory or understanding of her situation and only three other girls as companions. Slowly, Ao and the other girls begin to recall their memories as they venture into parallel dimensions, dubbed heartscapes.

External links
Official website

References

2021 video games
Gust Corporation games
Koei Tecmo games
LGBT-related video games
Magical girl video games
 Nintendo Switch games
PlayStation 4 games
Role-playing video games
Video game sequels
Video games developed in Japan
Video games featuring female protagonists
Yuri (genre) video games
Windows games